Jean Frances Speegle Howard (January 31, 1927 – September 2, 2000) was an American actress who acted primarily in film and on television. Howard appeared in over 30 television shows, mostly sitcoms, such as Married... with Children (1994–1996), but she also had guest spots on such series as Grace Under Fire (1993) and Buffy the Vampire Slayer (1997) beginning from 1975 (mostly during the 1980s and 1990s) until her death.

Early life
Howard was born Jean Frances Speegle in Duncan, Oklahoma, the daughter of Louise (née Dewey) and William Allen Speegle.

Career
Although she was an actress in film and television early on, her son Ron Howard said she largely put her career aside to raise her sons, Ron, born in 1954, and Clint, born in 1959. She appeared in the 1956 film Frontier Woman alongside husband Rance Howard and young son Ron Howard. In 1975, the entire family would act in the television film Huckleberry Finn. Howard appeared in a bit part in the 1985 film Cocoon. In the 1986 Christmas film A Smoky Mountain Christmas, Howard played Old Lady Jezebel alongside her husband, who played Dr. Jennings.

Howard worked regularly as a television guest star and in films in the 1990s appearing in popular series such as Lois & Clark: The New Adventures of Superman, The Wonder Years, and Roseanne. Howard also starred in Two of a Kind alongside Mary-Kate and Ashley Olsen. She acted in the 1994 film The Paper, and the 1996 film Matilda as the librarian, Mrs. Phelps.

In one of her last on-camera speaking roles, Howard portrayed astronaut Jim Lovell's mother in the 1995 motion picture Apollo 13.  When circumstances appear bleak for the crew, Howard's character says confidently, "If they could get a washing machine to fly, my Jimmy could land it." Her son and director of the film Ron Howard said, "It was a great moment."

Personal life
She married actor Rance Howard, also from Duncan, Oklahoma, in 1949. Their sons are actor and filmmaker Ron Howard and actor Clint Howard. Among her grandchildren are actresses Bryce Dallas Howard and Paige Howard, Paige's twin Jocelyn Carlyle, and their brother Reed Cross.

Death

On September 2, 2000, Howard died in Los Angeles, California of heart and respiratory illness. She was 73 years old. She is buried in Forest Lawn - Hollywood Hills Cemetery.

The 2000 film How the Grinch Stole Christmas, directed by her son Ron, includes a dedication to her at the beginning of the end credits, saying that she "loved Christmas the most." The film includes performances by her son Clint (as Whobris), her husband Rance (as the Elderly Timekeeper) and her granddaughter Bryce (as the Surprised Who).

Filmography

Film

Television

References

External links
 
 

1927 births
2000 deaths
People from Duncan, Oklahoma
Actresses from Oklahoma
American film actresses
American television actresses
Burials at Forest Lawn Memorial Park (Hollywood Hills)
Respiratory disease deaths in California
Jean Frances
20th-century American actresses